Rundle Range is a national park in Central Queensland, Australia, 471 km northwest of Brisbane. The park protects portions of the Calliope River and Fitzroy River drainage basins within the Brigalow Belt bioregion.

These are glossy black-cockatoo and the southern squatter pigeon.

See also

 Protected areas of Queensland

References

National parks of Central Queensland
Protected areas established in 1993